In mathematics, a function of  variables is symmetric if its value is the same no matter the order of its arguments.

A related notion is alternating polynomials, which change sign under an interchange of variables. Aside from polynomial functions, tensors that act as functions of several vectors can be symmetric, and in fact the space of symmetric -tensors on a vector space  is isomorphic to the space of homogeneous polynomials of degree  on  Symmetric functions should not be confused with even and odd functions, which have a different sort of symmetry.

Symmetrization 

Similarly, an anti-symmetric function can be constructed by summing over even permutations and subtracting the sum over odd permutations. These operations are of course not invertible, and could well result in a function that is identically zero for nontrivial functions  The only general case where  can be recovered if both its symmetrization and antisymmetrization are known is when  and the abelian group admits a division by 2 (inverse of doubling); then  is equal to half the sum of its symmetrization and its antisymmetrization.

Examples

Consider the real function

By definition, a symmetric function with  variables has the property that

In general, the function remains the same for every permutation of its variables. This means that, in this case,

and so on, for all permutations of 

Consider the function

which yields exactly the same results as the original 

Consider now the function

This function is not the same as the original if  which makes it non-symmetric.

Applications

U-statistics 

In statistics, an -sample statistic (a function in  variables) that is obtained by bootstrapping symmetrization of a -sample statistic, yielding a symmetric function in  variables, is called a U-statistic. Examples include the sample mean and sample variance.

See also

References

 F. N. David, M. G. Kendall & D. E. Barton (1966) Symmetric Function and Allied Tables, Cambridge University Press.
 Joseph P. S. Kung, Gian-Carlo Rota, & Catherine H. Yan (2009) Combinatorics: The Rota Way, §5.1 Symmetric functions, pp 222–5, Cambridge University Press, .

Combinatorics
 
Properties of binary operations